On with the Dance is a 1925 musical revue produced by C. B. Cochran, written and composed by Noël Coward and Philip Braham. Coward wrote his songs while he was acting in his first stage hit, The Vortex. 1925 was a busy year for Coward, in which he produced three other plays in London: Hay Fever, Fallen Angels and Easy Virtue.

The show, directed by Frank Collins, opened at the Palace Theatre, Manchester, England, on 17 March 1925 and transferred to the London Pavilion, where it ran for 229 performances. It is best remembered for Alice Delysia's singing "Poor Little Rich Girl". Cochran wanted to cut the piece and had to be dissuaded by Coward. As well as Delysia, the cast included Hermione Baddeley, Ernest Thesiger, Nigel Bruce and Douglas Byng. On opening night, Coward was not yet the famous name he would be by the end of the year: The Manchester Guardian review mentioned him only once, and The Times review did not mention him at all.

Songs
(In the order listed in The Lyrics of Noël Coward, pp. 19–30):
Cosmopolitan lady
I'm so in love
Poor little rich girl
First love
Couldn't we keep on dancing?
Raspberry time in Runcorn
Spinsters' song
The vicarage dance
Choir boys' song
Even clergymen are naughty now and then
Church parade
Come a little closer

The Noël Coward Society, drawing on performing statistics from the publishers and the Performing Rights Society, ranks "Poor little rich girl" among Coward's ten most popular songs.  The show also features four ballets, not by Coward. One of them, based on William Hogarth's The Rake’s Progress, was composed by Roger Quilter and choreographed by Leonid Massine.

Critical reception
The reviewer in The Sunday Times was not impressed, calling it "a curious mixture of perfect beauty and perfect drivel," with "not a good tune in the whole piece"; whereas The Times critic responded more positively, noting that "as a whole, with the dancing always preponderating, the revue [was] excellent." The Era's reviewer wrote on May 9, 1925, "The most comical thing in the revue is the Vicarage Garden Party on the lines of a musical comedy, with Miss Hermione Baddeley giving a clever and cruel burlesque of Nellie, the heroine, and Mr. Ernest Thesiger and Mr. Douglas Byng, as two clergymen, singing the funniest number of the evening."

Notes

References

Musicals by Noël Coward
1925 musicals
Revues
West End musicals
British musicals